Vasilij Žbogar (born 4 October 1975), is a Slovenian sailor. He was born in Koper.

Žbogar competed in the 2004 Summer Olympics, where he won a bronze medal and in the 2008 Summer Olympics, where he won a silver medal, both of them in laser class. In 2010, he competed in the Barcolana regatta as a member of the record-setting yacht Esimit Europa 2, winning the event. In 2016, he competed in 2016 Summer Olympics and won a silver medal in Finn class.

Žbogar was named Slovenian Sportsman of the year in 2004.

References 

1975 births
Living people
Slovenian male sailors (sport)
Sailors at the 2000 Summer Olympics – Laser
Sailors at the 2004 Summer Olympics – Laser
Sailors at the 2008 Summer Olympics – Laser
Sailors at the 2012 Summer Olympics – Finn
Olympic sailors of Slovenia
Olympic bronze medalists for Slovenia
Olympic silver medalists for Slovenia
Olympic medalists in sailing
Green Comm Racing sailors
Sportspeople from Koper
Medalists at the 2008 Summer Olympics
Medalists at the 2004 Summer Olympics
Medalists at the 2016 Summer Olympics
Sailors at the 2016 Summer Olympics – Finn
Mediterranean Games gold medalists for Slovenia
Competitors at the 2005 Mediterranean Games
Mediterranean Games medalists in sailing